George Edward Downs (25 July 1856 – 2 April 1936) was an Australian Test cricket umpire.

Life and career
Downs was born and died in North Adelaide, where he lived all his life. He went to school there at Whinham College. He worked as a carpenter and undertaker.

Downs played senior Adelaide cricket before becoming an umpire. He umpired 19 first-class matches between 1892 and 1903. His only Test was at the Adelaide Oval in March 1892, when W. G. Grace captained England to an innings victory over Australia.

Downs was also prominent in the early days of Australian rules football in Adelaide. He was one of the founders in 1874 of the Victorians team of North Adelaide, which competed in the SAFA. He captained them for eight seasons before the club folded at the end of the 1884 season. They won the premiership under his captaincy in 1877. He captained the Victorians against a team from Melbourne in 1877, in South Australia's first interstate football match. Two days later he played for a combined South Australian team against Victoria.

He married Fanny Howard in North Adelaide in November 1881. He died at home in April 1936, aged 79. Fanny and two sons and two daughters survived him; one son predeceased him. Fanny died in 1954, aged 96.

References

External links
 

1856 births
1936 deaths
Sportspeople from Adelaide
Australian rules footballers from South Australia
Australian Test cricket umpires